Tsvetanka Stoycheva (born 1 March 1960) is a Bulgarian archer who competed at the 1980 Summer Olympic Games.

Career 

She finished 27th in the women's individual event with 2144 points scored.

References

External links 
 Profile on worldarchery.org

1960 births
Living people
Bulgarian female archers
Olympic archers of Bulgaria
Archers at the 1980 Summer Olympics
Place of birth missing (living people)